Ethalia bysma is a species of sea snail, a marine gastropod mollusk in the family Trochidae, the top snails.

Distribution
This marine species occurs off South Africa.

References

External links
 To World Register of Marine Species
 Herbert, D. G. (1992). Revision of the Umboniinae (Mollusca: Prosobranchia: Trochidae) in southern Africa and Mozambique. Annals of the Natal Museum. 33(2):379-459
 Herbert D.G. (2015). An annotated catalogue and bibliography of the taxonomy, synonymy and distribution of the Recent Vetigastropoda of South Africa (Mollusca). Zootaxa. 4049(1): 1-98

bysma
Gastropods described in 1992